List of years in Korea may refer to:
 List of years in North Korea(from 1945 right after liberation to present)
 List of years in South Korea(from 1945 right after liberation to present)
To see overall timeline of korean history, see
 Timeline of Korean history
If you wanna wish to see each year before 1945 before the division of korea in detail, see 
List of years in Korea prior to 1945